Drobna deformis is an extinct species of prawn, the only species in the genus Drobna.

References

Penaeidae
Jurassic crustaceans
Monotypic arthropod genera